Abderrahim Talib (born 10 September 1963 in Casablanca) is a Moroccan football manager and former player.

References

Moroccan football managers
1962 births
Living people
RS Berkane managers
Wydad AC managers
Botola managers